Pietravairano is a comune (municipality) in the province of Caserta in the Italian region Campania, located about  north of Naples and about  northwest of Caserta.

References

External links
 Official website

Cities and towns in Campania